Mattox Creek is a stream in the U.S. state of Georgia.

Mattox Creek was named after Joseph Maddox, a pioneer settler. Variant names are "Maddocks Creek" and "Maddox Creek".

References

Rivers of Georgia (U.S. state)
Rivers of McDuffie County, Georgia